Viktor Örn Margeirsson (born 22 July 1994) is an Icelandic footballer who plays as a defender for Breiðablik and the Iceland national team.

Career
Viktor has played his entire career with Breiðablik, apart from a few loan spells.

International career
Viktor Örn made his international debut for Iceland on 6 November 2022 in a friendly match against Saudi Arabia.

Personal life
His brother is fellow footballer Finnur Orri Margeirsson.

References

External links
 
 

1994 births
Living people
Viktor Orn Margeirsson
Viktor Orn Margeirsson
Viktor Orn Margeirsson